Bottle gentian is a common name for several plants and may refer to:

 Gentiana andrewsii, native to northeastern North America
 Gentiana catesbaei
 Gentiana clausa, native to southeastern North America